Robert Vallis (1876 in England, UK – 19 December 1932 in Brighton, Sussex) was a British actor.

Selected filmography
 A Son of David (1920)
 Her Benny (1920)
 Gwyneth of the Welsh Hills (1921)
 The Amazing Partnership (1921)
 General John Regan (1921)
 A Gentleman of France (1921)
 The Four Just Men (1921)
 Little Brother of God (1922)
 Squibs' Honeymoon (1923)
 Beautiful Kitty (1923)
 Hurricane Hutch in Many Adventures (1924)
 Not for Sale (1924)

References

External links
 

1876 births
1932 deaths
English male film actors
English male silent film actors
People from Brighton
20th-century English male actors